Alain Roca Borrero (born September 7, 1976) is a volleyball player from Cuba. A two-time Olympian (1996 and 2000), he was honoured as Best Setter at the 2001 Volleyball America's Cup in Buenos Aires, Argentina, where Cuba finished in second place.

As of 2012–2013 he was playing on Fakel Novy Urengoy

Honours
 1995: Start in the National Team of Cuba
 Preolympic Games- Calgary, Canada (gold medal)
 1996: World League – Rotterdam, Holland (4th place) and "Best Service"
 Olympic Games – Atlanta, USA (6th place)
 1997: World League – Moscow, Russia (silver medal)
 World Grand Champions Cup – Japan (bronze medal)
 Norceca Championship – Puerto Rico (gold medal)
 1998: World League – Milan, Italy (gold medal)
 World Champion – Japan (bronze medal) and "2nd Best Receiver"
 Season 98-99 Cuneo, Italy (4th place)
 Italy Cup – (gold medal) and "Record Speed Service"
 Cope delle Coppe Europe – (silver medal)
 Centroamerican Games – Maracaibo, Venezuela (gold medal)
 America Cup – Argentina (bronze medal)
 Norceca Championship – Monterrey, Mexico (silver medal)
 1999: World League – Argentina (silver medal)
 World Cup – Japan (silver medal)
 Season 99-00 Montichiari, Italy
 Italy Cup – (silver medal)
 America Cup – Tampa; Orlando, USA (bronze medal)
 2000: America Cup – São Paulo, Brazil (gold medal)
 Olympic Games – Sydney, Australia (7th place)
 2001: Norceca Championship – Barbados (gold medal) "Best Setter" and "Best Service"
 America Cup – Argentina (silver medal) and "Best Setter"
 World Grand Champions Cup – Japan (gold medal) and "Best Setter"
 2002: World League Participation – National Team of Cuba
 2007-2008: Tigre Unisul, Brazil
 Minero Championship (silver medal)
 Santa Catarina State Championship (gold medal)
 Super League (4th place)
 2008-2009: Tigre Unisul, Brazil
 Santa Catarina State Championship (silver medal)
 Super League (4th place)
 2009-2010: Pinheiros-SKY, Brazil
 Super League (bronze medal)
 2010-2011: Halkbank Sport Club, Ankara-Turkey
 Turkey Championship (third place)
 2011: August to 30 December: Top Volley Andreoli Latina, Italy
 "All Star Volley" Marcelo Gabana in Memorial
 2012: 31 December to 30 April: Ural-Ufa Volley, Russia
 Russia Championship (5th place)
 2012-2013: Club Fakel Novy Urengoy- Russia
 Siberian Cup (bronze medal)
 Russia Championship (5th place)
 Individual Titles: Best Service- World League 1996 (Rotterdam, Holland)
 2nd Best Reception- World Cup 1998 (Japan)
 Record Speed Service (117 km/h) – Italy Cup 1999 (Rome, Italy)
 Best Setter – Championship Norceca 2001 (Barbados)
 Best Service – Championship Norceca 2001 (Barbados)
 Best Setter – America Cup 2001 (Argentina)
 Best setter – World Grand Championship Cup 2001 (Japan)
 "All Star Volley" Marcelo Gabana in Memorial 2011 (Monza, Italy)

References
 FIVB Profile
 
 Alain Roca official website

External links
Alain Roca website

1976 births
Living people
Cuban men's volleyball players
Volleyball players at the 1996 Summer Olympics
Volleyball players at the 2000 Summer Olympics
Olympic volleyball players of Cuba
Sportspeople from Havana
Place of birth missing (living people)
Ural Ufa volleyball players
20th-century Cuban people